Antthony Mark Hankins (born November 10, 1968) is an American fashion designer who founded Antthony Mark Hankins Inc. in 1994. By his mid-twenties he had built his own $40 million business and was named by Newsweek as one of the top 100 people to watch in America.

Early life 
Antthony has been featured in Business Week Magazine (November 1997), The Wall Street Journal (October 1995) and numerous other publications as a success story of a poor, African-American boy from a New Jersey factory town.

He was born in Elizabeth, New Jersey, to Mary Jane and Ramone Moya. He is the youngest of seven children and has a twin sister. His parents divorced when Antthony was young and at the age of twelve his mother remarried.

He attended art classes and sewing classes at Roosevelt Middle School in Roselle. In his free time he designed clothing for friends and colleagues. His first sewing machine cost $150 which he had loaned from a friend at the Elizabeth's Union County courthouse where he worked part-time as an administrative assistant.

Education and career

Early life 
His portfolio of pieces was the key to securing an interview to attend the Pratt Institute's School of Design in Brooklyn, New York, from 1986 to 1988. Shortly after he graduated, at the age of nineteen, he was accepted at the École de la Chambre Syndicale de la Couture Parisienne in Paris, France as the second American and first African-American student.

To earn the $10,000 tuition and secure a plane ticket to Paris, Antthony contacted Christy Ferer, a fashion correspondent with the Today Show to help get him exposure. They agreed to do a two part piece the latter of which was shot in Paris and aired December 9, 1988.  The national exposure opened doors for Antthony and from it an anonymous donation came in the mail which allowed him to secure a plane ticket to Paris.

From 1988 to 1989 Antthony continued to expand his education in fashion in Paris at the École de la Chambre Syndicale de la Couture Parisienne and is numbered among alumni including Karl Lagerfeld and Yves-Saint-Laurant.

The Chambre Syndicale governs the Paris fashion houses, setting the standards and rules of the industry. The school was founded in 1929 by the Chambre Syndicale to provide talent and skilled labor for the Paris design houses.

As a student, Anthony Mark Hankins apprenticed with Yves Saint Laurant in Paris (1988–1990). Later, he also apprenticed for Adrienne Vittadini, Willi Smith (1986), Michael Paris, and Homer Layne (1987).

During that time it was at an interview with Bob Mackie, an Emmy winning designer for shows like Carol Burnett Show and The Sonny & Cher Comedy Hour, which pointed him towards the ready-to-wear mass market.

Antthony Originals
Returning to the United States in 1992, Antthony Mark Hankins began working at JCPenney Corporation as the Quality Assurance Manager. In this role he utilized his skills and eye for fashion to drive his career forward. Within eight weeks he had been promoted to become the first and only in-house designer in the Minority Supplier Development Division at JCPenney's corporate headquarters in Dallas.

Antthony left JCPenney in 1994 when he founded Ramone Moya Ltd. which was the umbrella company for the AMH Group and Antthony Mark Hankins Inc. JCPenney agreed to carry his initial line. The first article about the company ran in the July 2, 1994, issue of the Dallas Morning News headlined "Breaking Out of the Pattern" written by Maria Halkias.

Once his exclusivity with JCPenney expired he also marketed to Target with his line called "Authentics" and Kmart with "Anjalise." His ready to wear collections were also featured in Nordstrom and Sears. By 1996 he had revenues of $40 million in annual sales.

All of Antthony's designs are created in the United States. He has had success selling worldwide in PX stores for the Army and Air Force Exchange Service (AAFES).

He was next approached by Black Entertainment Television to do a home-shopping program called BET Shop which had a direct connection to the Home Shopping Network. On March 31, 1996, he had his first appearance on HSN. He is now in his seventeenth year as a designer on the Home Shopping Network for ready-wear-fashions.

Fashion labels 
 Home Shopping Network
In addition to HSN The Antthony Design Studio collection is sold in department stores and boutiques across the nation.

 Couture Collection
This is a collection of social dresses and separates. All designs are all handcrafted in the United States.

 Band of Artists
A limited series of accessories launched in 2010.

Fashion labels 
 Antthony Originals – HSN
 Anthtony – Couture Collection
 The Signature Collection of Anthony Mark Hankins – major department stores
 Authentics by Anthony Mark Hankins – target department stores
 Butterick Patterns launched July 1995
 TonyWear – Hudson Bay Stores / Canada
 Shopping with Anthony – HSN
 The "A” Label for Antthony Mark Hankins
 Band of Artists

Recognition

Awards
 "Young Star Award"- 1997: Trumpet Awards/Turner Broadcasting
Designed a couture item for the 1995 recipients
 100 Top People to Watch in the Millennium – 1997: Newsweek
 Entrepreneur of the Year – 1997: Business Week
 Linden New Day Associates – 1996
 Black Retail Action Group (BRAG) – 1996
Non-profit organization dedicated to promoting the acceptance of African-Americans and other minorities at all levels of retail and related industries.
 City Proclamations
Dallas, Texas; Wichita, Kansas; Elizabeth, New Jersey; Tulsa, Oklahoma

References

Bibliography 
Fabric of Dreams: Designing My Own Success
By Anthony Mark Hankins with Debbie Markley
Published March 1998

External links 
 

American fashion designers
Clothing brands
American companies established in 1994
Clothing companies of the United States